Alpha Mission II is a vertically scrolling full screen shoot 'em up released by SNK in 1991 for the Neo Geo arcade and home systems. It is the sequel to the 1985 arcade game Alpha Mission. It was later released for the Neo Geo CD in 1994 and for the PlayStation Portable in 2010.

The player controls a fighter spacecraft (Armored Scrum Object) and can shoot enemies in the air, bomb enemies on the ground, collect power-ups, and defeat bosses to advance levels.

Gameplay

The game controls uses 2 or 3 buttons used depending on the selected shuttle mode. The ship's armaments consist of air-to-air laser shots, air-to-ground missiles and any Power Weapons the player collects. The laser and missiles can be upgraded up to four times by collecting the powerups from drones that are shot. Power Weapons are available after the player collects three pieces of the same armour type or can be bought with credits acquired after each stage.

The weapons have limited power indicated on an energy meter. Using the weapons or getting the ship damaged lowers the energy. The energy can be recharged by collecting E power ups. Once the energy expires, the ship returns to normal mode. Depending on which mode is selected varies whether Button C or B activates the Power Weapons. Various hidden items can do certain things like an R item can put the shuttle in Reverse for a certain distance. The shuttle is destroyed by one shot or by running into an enemy unit or hazard. Unless the player collects enough K power-ups beforehand, the missiles and laser shots will be lost to minimum power when the player loses a life.

There are seven stages in the game, with the last one consisting of a single boss battle. The player has to fight through them avoiding hazards in addition. Mid-bosses very occasionally appear in the game. When the player meets a mid-boss or end stage boss, the player must destroy weak points and various parts of the boss to destroy it.

Development and release

Reception 

In Japan, Game Machine listed Alpha Mission II on their May 1, 1991 issue as being the most-popular arcade game at the time. Since its initial release in arcades, the game has been met with generally positive reception from critics.

AllGames Paul Biondich regarded it as a worthy successor to the original Alpha Mission and praised its complex weapon system, crisp graphics and simple controls although Kyle Knight gave the game more mixed outlook, stating that the enemy designs were dated and the aforementioned weapon system was a detriment. Consoles Plus Kaneda Kun and François Hermelin commended the presentation, sound design, playability and original weapon. Both Kun and Hermelin noted that the lack of unlimited continues prolongs the title's overall longevity. Computer and Video Games Paul Rand gave positive remarks the visuals for its quality, sound, difficulty and playability. Rand also noted that the lack of unlimited continues made it worthwhile.

GameFans four reviewers highlighted the visuals, soundtrack, bosses and weapon variety in a positive manner, deeming it to be better than Last Resort but not as good as Viewpoint. Both Joypads Seb and Joysticks Jean-Marc Demoly gave very high praise to the graphics, animations, controls and sound. Likewise, Player Ones Cyril Drevet commended the animated visuals, weapon system, sound difficulty and playability. Sinclair Users John Cook stated that its weapon system required thought to build them at their maximum state and attack enemies. Génération 4s Frank Ladoire and Consolemanias Piemarco Rosa highly praised the colorful and detailed graphics, anime-style soundtrack and playability. Game Zones David Wilson reviewed the arcade version, regarding it to be a fun game, noting its weapon system and ability to equip weapons between levels. Zeros Doris Stokes also regarded the game to be fun but stated that the amount of action on-screen made it frenetic.

Nintendo Lifes Damien McFerran stated that the Armor weapon system was interesting, praising the bosses but criticized the levels for being repetitive. In contrasts, Nintendo World Reports Casey Gibson stated that the power-up system was convoluted power-up system and criticized the level design for being bland. Pure Nintendo Magazines Kaelyn Daugherty also stated that the weapon system added variety but criticized certain design aspects.

Notes

References

External links 
 Alpha Mission II at Giant Bomb
 Alpha Mission II at Killer List of Videogames
 Alpha Mission II at MobyGames

1991 video games
ACA Neo Geo games
Arcade video games
Cooperative video games
D4 Enterprise games
Multiplayer and single-player video games
Neo Geo games
Neo Geo CD games
Nintendo Switch games
PlayStation Network games
PlayStation 4 games
Hamster Corporation games
SNK games
SNK Playmore games
Vertically scrolling shooters
Virtual Console games
Windows games
Xbox One games
Video games developed in Japan